Bolton Crook Street passenger station was a purely temporary facility within the Bolton Crook Street goods yard, devised by the LNWR for use while their nearby Great Moor Street station was demolished and rebuilt. It was used as such from August 1871 to September 1874, after which it reverted to use solely for goods.

The temporary passenger station's exact location within the goods yard is believed to be the goods shed on the eastern side of Chandos Street.

Sources differ on whether Great Moor St station reopened in September 1874 or April 1875. The original service to Kenyon Junction was provided continuously from 1831 to 1954, but the new, additional service to Manchester Exchange via Roe Green Junction and Walkden Low Level by the London and North Western Railway which did not start until 1 April 1875, when it ran from Great Moor Street. It is therefore possible that Crook Street handed the Kenyon Junction traffic to the new Great Moor Street station in 1874.

Accidents

On 29 October 1875, an accident occurred at Roe Green Junction but the official register of accidents gives no actual details

On 16 March 1918 a goods train from Little Hulton "ran away" on the falling gradients towards Bolton. An alert signalman diverted it into Crook Street depot where it crashed through buffer stops, crossed cobbled land, crashed through a boundary wall and into the cellar of a house on Crook Street. The crew had jumped clear and, remarkably, no-one was hurt.

Closure
After a long period of decline Crook Street goods depot was finally closed to all traffic on 1 October 1967.

The site has been redeveloped in the years since and by 2015 no trace of its railway origins could be seen.

References

Sources

External links
 The neighbouring station via Disused Stations UK
 The goods yard on a 1948 OS map via npe maps
 The goods yard on an 1885 series OS map overlay via National Library of Scotland
 The station and line via railwaycodes

History of Bolton
Former London and North Western Railway stations
Railway stations in Great Britain opened in 1871
Railway stations in Great Britain closed in 1874
Disused railway stations in the Metropolitan Borough of Bolton